Skenfrith was an ancient hundred of Monmouthshire. 

It contained the following ancient parishes:

Grosmont
Llantilio Crossenny
Llangattock-Vibon-Avel
Monmouth
Rockfield
Skenfrith
St. Maughans
Wonastow

The exclave of Welsh Bicknor was transferred to Herefordshire in 1844.  Other parts of the hundred are now administered by the local authority of Monmouthshire.

External links
Skenfrith Hundred on a Vision of Britain